The Gloucester County Institute of Technology (GCIT) is a four-year vocational-technical public high school located in Deptford Township in Gloucester County, New Jersey. It  operates as part of the Gloucester County Vocational-Technical School District. The school has a Sewell mailing address.

GCIT offers nine full-time programs. Students must apply and be selected to attend GCIT. GCIT currently accepts approximately 350 students per year. Acceptance is based on final marking period grades from 7th grade and the beginning marking period grades for 8th grade, and state standardized test scores, attendance and a mandatory shadow visit.

As of the 2021–22 school year, the school had an enrollment of 1,603 students and 108.0 classroom teachers (on an FTE basis), for a student–teacher ratio of 14.8:1. There were 87 students (5.4% of enrollment) eligible for free lunch and 17 (1.1% of students) eligible for reduced-cost lunch.

Awards, recognition and rankings
Schooldigger.com ranked GCIT 85th out of 396 public high schools statewide in its 2012 rankings, representing an increase of 31 positions from its 2011 ranking. The rankings are based on the combined percentage of students classified as proficient or above proficient on the mathematics (89.3%) and language arts literacy (99.3%) components of the High School Proficiency Assessment (HSPA).

Adult programs
Adult High School
Air Conditioning & Refrigeration/EPA Certification
Automotive Technology
Baking & Pastry Arts
Collision Technology
Cosmetology
Culinary Arts
Electrical Theory
Health Sciences
Marine Engine Maintenance
Plumbing
Rough Framing
Welding

Academics
GCIT offers honors classes for all students, and honors classes are mandated for all Academy students. All Career-Technical students have the option to take College Preparatory (CP) courses or honors. GCIT offers language courses in Spanish, Latin, and Italian. Two years of a language are required to graduate, but four levels are offered with an independent study option available.

GCIT offers several electives. Students can choose from Rowan College at Gloucester County courses instead of taking high school electives to receive dual credit. The tuition for these courses is paid for by the district, but students are responsible for books. GCIT also offers extracurricular clubs. GCIT follows the National Academy Foundation's cooperative learning initiative, where teachers focus on group discussions, projects, and research papers.

APA research paper 
All students in College Prep (CP) and Honors classes at GCIT must complete an APA research paper (although teachers may vary the format at their discretion). To assist students, GCIT staff members provide a free APA manual that students can download. This manual is available on GCIT's website or by the following link.

Athletics 
The GCIT Cheetahs compete as one of the member schools in the Tri-County Conference, which is comprised of 21 public and private high schools located in Camden, Cape May, Cumberland, Gloucester, and Salem counties. The conference is overseen by the New Jersey State Interscholastic Athletic Association (NJSIAA). With 1,209 athletes in grades 9-12 as of the 2022-2023 school year, the school was classified by the NJSIAA as Group IV for most athletic competition purposes, which included schools with an enrollment of 1,060 to 5,049 students in that grade range. The Cheetahs is the name of all GCIT's sporting teams.

GCIT's varsity softball team successfully defended the NJTAC state tournament title in 2007, defeating Sussex County Technical School 22-1. GCIT's boys' soccer team has made the New Jersey state playoffs for two consecutive years, and its boys' baseball team has won back-to-back state championships.

GCIT has an Olympic-size swimming pool and a fitness room with free weights and treadmills, which were completed as part of a $9.9 million expansion project approved in 1993. The pool is used for practice by 13 members of the Tri-County Conference and a USA Swimming team. GCIT currently allows the public to use the pool and fitness rooms at set times for set fees. Students gain free, unlimited access to these facilities.

GCIT currently offers many sports but does not have its own football team, which is common in vocational schools. Currently, students who want to play football or any other that sport GCIT does not offer are permitted to play on their home district's team.

Community involvement and services

Community
GCIT offers several services to the public. Its School of Cosmetology offers salon services. The School of Culinary Arts offers a catering menu and takes orders for the bakery.  The School of Transportation offers services for live work. The Fitness Center and pool are open for the Gloucester County residents and members.

GCIT is also involved in community projects, including the City of Hope Walk, Style-A-Thon, Out of the Darkness Suicide Prevention Walk, Love Our Vets, and others. In addition, the HOSA club holds an annual blood drive for the American Red Cross.

School Based Youth Services
School Based Youth Services (SBYS) offers free counseling for teenagers between the ages of 13-19 who live in Gloucester County. They also provide counseling for their family members. SBYS is open from 8AM to 8PM on Mondays to Thursdays and 8AM to 3PM on Fridays. SBYS provides counseling on a wide variety of topics, including drugs, stress, depression, sexual orientation, family problems, and others. SBYS also organizes recreational activities for the students of GCIT.

Youth One Stop GED Program
The Youth One Stop GED Program provides GED test preparation to out-of-school teens in Gloucester County. They work with teens between the ages of 16-21. They also offer students recreational trips, community services, and other programs. The One Stop Youth Center is open from 8AM to 4PM Mondays to Thursdays. The One Stop Youth Center provides a monetary reward weekly for meeting their educational and attendance objectives.

School newspaper
GCIT's school newspaper is Cheetah News.

Administration
The school's principal is Jamie Dundee. His administration team includes the four assistant principals.

References

External links
GCIT's Official Website

Deptford Township, New Jersey
Public high schools in Gloucester County, New Jersey
Vocational schools in New Jersey